The El Dorado Refinery is located in El Dorado, Kansas, United States.

See also
 Oil refinery
 Petroleum
 List of oil refineries

External links 
 

Buildings and structures in Butler County, Kansas
Oil refineries in the United States
Energy infrastructure in Kansas
El Dorado, Kansas